The 2015–16 season was UD Almería's twentieth sixth season of existence and the first in Segunda División since suffering relegation in the last round of the 2014–15 La Liga. The club returned to the second tier after a two-year absence.

Squad

Coaches

Staff members

Source: UD Almería's official website

Transfers

In

Total spending:  €1,000,000

Out

Total gaining:  €2,800,000

Balance
Total:  €1,800,000

Contracts

Player statistics

Squad stats 

 

|-
|colspan="12"|Players on loan to other clubs:

|-
|colspan="12"|Players who have left the club after the start of the season:

|}

Top scorers

Disciplinary record

Competitions

Pre-season/Friendlies

Segunda División

Results summary

Results by round

Matches

Copa del Rey

References

Almeria
UD Almería seasons
2015–16 Segunda División